Réjean Giroux (born September 13, 1952) is a Canadian former professional ice hockey right winger who played for the Quebec Nordiques of the World Hockey Association. He is the father of NHL and KHL player Alexandre Giroux. As a youth, Giroux played in the 1964 Quebec International Pee-Wee Hockey Tournament with the Quebec Beavers minor ice hockey team.

Career statistics

References

External links
 

1952 births
Living people
Beauce Jaros players
Canadian ice hockey right wingers
Chicago Blackhawks draft picks
Dallas Black Hawks players
French Quebecers
Ice hockey people from Quebec City
Maine Nordiques players
Quebec Nordiques (WHA) players
Quebec Remparts players